Langnes Station was a railway station located at Langnes in Askim, Norway. Established as a flag stop in 1928, it saw limited traffic, with only 28 daily boarding and disembarking passengers in 2008. The station was moved  eastwards in 1989. It consisted of a simple side platform and a shed. The station closed on 9 November 2012.

History
Langnes was established as a flag stop in 1928, when the Norwegian State Railways introduced flag stops at a large number of intersections along the Eastern Østfold Line in order to compete better with bus and truck services. The station was moved  eastwards from 1 February 1989. The moving involved building a new platform and shed, which was situated on the other side of the tracks as before.

Due to the short platform, the Norwegian National Rail Administration was required by the Norwegian Railway Authority to either upgrade the platforms or close the station by 2012. The Rail Administration evaluated that the station had limited patronage and little possibilities of future growth and therefore decided to close it and three other stations on the line. Participating factors was that any expansion of the station and any new parking spaces would have to be taken from agricultural land. The closing took effect on 9 December 2012.

Facilities

The station was situated in an agricultural area with little population in the immediate vicinity. Access was available via a gravel road, with limited sign posting which made it difficult to find. There were about 500 people living within a  radius of the station. There were 1,223 within . The station had 28 daily boarding and disembarking passengers in 2008.

References

Disused railway stations in Norway
Railway stations in Askim
Railway stations on the Østfold Line
Railway stations opened in 1928
Railway stations closed in 2012
1928 establishments in Norway
2012 disestablishments in Norway